Győr–Celldömölk railway line is the MÁV line number 10. It is a single track, non-electrified route. Electrification has been proposed.

Railway lines in Hungary